Cheruskia (minor planet designation: 568 Cheruskia) is a minor planet orbiting the Sun that was discovered by German astronomer Paul Götz on 26 July 1905 from Heidelberg.

Photometric observations of this asteroid at the Palmer Divide Observatory in Colorado Springs, Colorado, during 2008 gave a light curve with a period of 13.209 ± 0.001 hours and a brightness variation of 0.10 ± 0.01 in magnitude. This is in disagreement with a previous study reported in 2000 that gave a period estimate of 14.654 hours.

References

External links 
 Lightcurve plot of 568 Cheruskia, Palmer Divide Observatory, B. D. Warner (2008)
 Asteroid Lightcurve Database (LCDB), query form (info )
 Dictionary of Minor Planet Names, Google books
 Asteroids and comets rotation curves, CdR – Observatoire de Genève, Raoul Behrend
 Discovery Circumstances: Numbered Minor Planets (1)-(5000) – Minor Planet Center
 
 

Background asteroids
Cheruskia
Cheruskia
19050726